The women's 200 metres at the 1962 European Athletics Championships was held in Belgrade, then Yugoslavia, at JNA Stadium on 14 and 15 September 1962.

Medalists

Results

Final
15 September
Wind: -2.3 m/s

Semi-finals
14 September

Semi-final 1
Wind: 0 m/s

Semi-final 2
Wind: 0 m/s

Heats
14 September

Heat 1
Wind: 1.3 m/s

Heat 2
Wind: 1 m/s

Heat 3
Wind: 2.8 m/s

Heat 4
Wind: 0.9 m/s

Participation
According to an unofficial count, 16 athletes from 10 countries participated in the event.

 (1)
 (1)
 (3)
 (1)
 (1)
 (2)
 (1)
 (3)
 (2)
 (1)

References

200 metres
200 metres at the European Athletics Championships
Euro